is a former Nippon Professional Baseball outfielder.

External links

1971 births
Living people
Baseball people from Kagoshima Prefecture
Japanese baseball players
Nippon Professional Baseball outfielders
Chunichi Dragons players
Japanese baseball coaches
Nippon Professional Baseball coaches